Ndoc is an Albanian masculine given name. Notable people with the name include:

 Ndoc Gjetja (1944–2010), Albanian poet
 Ndoc Mark Gega (c. 1830–1907), Albanian patriot
 Ndoc Nikaj (1864–1951), Albanian priest, writer, and historian
 Ndoc Martini (1880–1916), Albanian painter

Albanian masculine given names